The Bohai Sea is a marginal sea approximately  in area on the east coast of Mainland China. It is the northwestern and innermost extension of the Yellow Sea, to which it connects to the east via the Bohai Strait.

The Bohai Sea is enclosed by three provinces and one direct-administered municipality from three different regions of China — Liaoning Province (of Northeast China), Hebei Province and Tianjin Municipality (of North China), and Shandong Province (of East China). The whole of the Bohai Sea is considered a part of both the internal waters [citation needed - much of the Bohai Sea is outside of the 12 nm territorial limit and therefore international waters] of the People's Republic of China and the center of the Bohai Economic Rim. Its proximity to the Chinese capital of Beijing and the municipality of Tianjin makes it one of the busiest seaways in the world.

History
During the Pleistocene, the Bohai Sea experienced numerous glacioeustatic transgressions and regressions, as evidenced by sediment cores sampled from the seafloor showing fluvial floodplain conditions during intervals of low sea level.

Until the early 20th century, Bo Hai was often called the Gulf of Zhili or Gulf of Beizhili. The romanization systems widely used in the West at the time rendered these names as variations of "Jili", "Chihli", "Pechihli", or "Pe-Chihli". Zhili and North Zhili were historic provinces in an area surrounding Beijing that approximately corresponds to what is now Hebei Province.

Geography 
There are three major bays inside the Bohai Gulf: Laizhou Bay to the south, Bohai Bay to the west, and Liaodong Bay to the north. The provincial-level administrative divisions that have a coastline to the Bohai Sea are, from the south going clockwise: Shandong, Hebei, Tianjin (Tientsin), Hebei again, and Liaoning. Some of the major rivers draining into the gulf include the Yellow River, Xiaoqing River, Hai River, Luan River, Dai River, Daling River, Xiaoling River, Liao River and Daliao River. There are a few important oil reserves in the vicinity of the gulf, including the Shengli Field. Important islands or island groups in the gulf include the Changshan Archipelago, Juehua Island, Bijia Mountain, Changxing Island, Xizhong Island, the East/West Mayi Islands, Zhu Island and She Island.

Bohai Strait 
The opening of the Bohai Gulf is bounded by the Changshan Archipelago between Dalian's Lüshunkou District on the southern tip of Liaodong Peninsula, and the Cape of Penglai on the northernmost protrusion of Shandong Peninsula. Due to its proximity to the capital city Beijing and the population of its surrounding provinces exceeding 210 million, the exit of the Bohai Gulf to the Yellow Sea, the Bohai Strait, has become one of busiest sea routes in recent times. Due to the Changshan Island Chain traversing the southern half of the strait, the strait is subdivided into several channels:

(from north to south, the most commonly used ones in bold)

 Laotieshan Channel, also known as the Lau-ti-shan Channel, is the widest and deepest
 Daqin Channel
 Xiaoqin Channel
 North Tuoji Channel
 South Tuoji Channel
 Changshan Channel, is the most direct route to Tianjin
 Dengzhou Channel, also known as the Miaodao Channel or Miaodao Strait, is the nearest to the shore but also the shallowest

Major ports

There are five major ports along the Bohai Sea rim, with throughputs over 100 million tons, though the port of Tangshan is further subdivided into Jingtang and Caofeidian:

Port of Yingkou
Qinhuangdao Port
Port of Jingtang
Port of Tangshan
Port of Tangshan Caofeidian
Tianjin Port
Port of Huanghua

Caofeidian and Jingtang are usually treated as one port for statistical purposes. The ports of Dalian and Yantai are also traditionally considered part of the Bohai rim, even though strictly speaking they lie outside the limits of the sea. The Port of Longkou reached 70 million tons of cargo in 2013, and is expected to reach the 100 million ton landmark in the near future.

Major cities along the Bohai Sea coast

 Liaoning
 Dalian
 Yingkou
 Panjin
 Jinzhou
 Huludao
 Hebei
 Qinhuangdao
 Tangshan
 Cangzhou
 Tianjin municipality 
 Shandong
 Yantai
 Weifang
 Dongying
 Binzhou

Hydrocarbon resources
The Bohai Bay contains significant oil and gas reserves, which provide much of China's offshore production. The main field in the region, named Shengli, has been exploited since the 1960s. It still produces about half a million barrels a day, but is declining. Production is dominated by Chinese majors (China National Offshore Oil Corporation was mostly created for this region), but foreign companies, including ConocoPhillips and Roc Oil Company, are present. The Gudao Field, located in the Zhanhua sedimentary basin, was discovered in 1968, based on gravity, magnetic and seismic surveys conducted between 1963 and 1964. The reservoir includes the Guantao (Miocene) and Minghuazhen (Pliocene) geologic formations within the dome-like anticline. The Suizhong 36-1 Oil Field was discovered in 1987, and produces from Oligocene fluvial-deltaic and lacustrine sandstones. Oil spills have been reported frequently in this region: three spills occurred in a two-month timeframe in 2011.

Tunnel crossing 

In February 2011, China announced that it would build a road and rail tunnel across the Bohai Strait to connect the Liaodong and Shandong peninsulas. In July 2013, a modified plan was announced, involving a -long tunnel between Dalian, Liaoning and Yantai, Shandong. The overall concept had its origins in a 1994 plan, which had been intended for completion by 2010 at a cost of $10 billion.

See also 
 Balhae
 Bohai Commandery
 Bohai Economic Rim

Notes

References

External links 

 Unep Reports – Regional Definition: Bohai Sea

 
Bays of China
Metropolitan areas of China
Gulfs of the Pacific Ocean
Bodies of water of the Yellow Sea
China Seas